The 5th parallel north is a circle of latitude that is 5 degrees north of the Earth's equatorial plane. It crosses the Atlantic Ocean, Africa, the Indian Ocean, Southeast Asia, the Pacific Ocean, and South America.

The Pacific Ocean is at its widest (approximately 19,300 km) on this parallel.

Around the world
Starting at the Prime Meridian and heading eastwards, the parallel 5° north passes through:
{| class="wikitable plainrowheaders"
! scope="col" width="125" | Co-ordinates
! scope="col" | Country, territory or sea
! scope="col" | Notes
|-valign="top"
| style="background:#b0e0e6;" | 
! scope="row" style="background:#b0e0e6;" | Atlantic Ocean
| style="background:#b0e0e6;" | Bight of Benin
|-
| 
! scope="row" | 
|
|-
| 
! scope="row" | 
|
|-
| 
! scope="row" | 
|
|-
| 
! scope="row" | 
|
|-
| 
! scope="row" | 
|
|-
| 
! scope="row" | 
|
|-
| 
! scope="row" | 
|
|-
| 
! scope="row" | 
|
|-
| 
! scope="row" | 
|
|-
| 
! scope="row" | Ilemi Triangle
|-
| 
! scope="row" | 
|
|-
| 
! scope="row" | 
|
|-
| 
! scope="row" | 
|
|-valign="top"
| style="background:#b0e0e6;" | 
! scope="row" style="background:#b0e0e6;" | Indian Ocean
| style="background:#b0e0e6;" | Passing between Southern Maalhosmadulhu Atoll and Horsburgh Atoll,  Passing just north of the island of Kaashidhoo, 
|-
| 
! scope="row" | 
| Island of Sumatra
|-
| style="background:#b0e0e6;" | 
! scope="row" style="background:#b0e0e6;" | Strait of Malacca
| style="background:#b0e0e6;" |
|-
| 
! scope="row" | 
| Perak, Kelantan, Terengganu, on Peninsular Malaysia
|-
| 
! scope="row" |  
| Kampung Gong Balai, Terengganu on Peninsular Malaysia
|
|-
| 
! scope="row" | 
| On the island of Borneo
|-
| style="background:#b0e0e6;" | 
! scope="row" style="background:#b0e0e6;" | Brunei Bay
| style="background:#b0e0e6;" |
|-
| 
! scope="row" | 
| Sabah, island of Borneo
|-valign="top"
| style="background:#b0e0e6;" | 
! scope="row" style="background:#b0e0e6;" | Celebes Sea
| style="background:#b0e0e6;" | Passing north of the Sibutu islands,  Passing between the islands of Bongao and Simunul, 
|-
| 
! scope="row" | 
| Island of Bilatan
|-valign="top"
| style="background:#b0e0e6;" | 
! scope="row" style="background:#b0e0e6;" | Celebes Sea
| style="background:#b0e0e6;" | Passing just south of the islands of Banaran and Mantabuan, 
|-valign="top"
| style="background:#b0e0e6;" | 
! scope="row" style="background:#b0e0e6;" | Pacific Ocean
| style="background:#b0e0e6;" | Passing between the islands of Sonsorol and Pulo Anna,  Passing just south of Satawan and Kosrae atolls,  Passing between Namdrik and Ebon atolls,  Passing just north of Teraina atoll,  Passing just south of Cocos Island, 
|-
| 
! scope="row" | 
|
|-
| 
! scope="row" | 
|
|-
| 
! scope="row" | 
| Roraima
|-
| 
! scope="row" | Disputed area
|-
| 
! scope="row" | 
|
|-
| 
! scope="row" | 
| For about 7 km
|-
| 
! scope="row" | 
| For about 6 km
|-
| 
! scope="row" | 
| For about 8 km
|-
| 
! scope="row" | 
| For about 12 km
|-
| 
! scope="row" | 
|
|-
| 
! scope="row" | 
| French Guiana
|-
| style="background:#b0e0e6;" | 
! scope="row" style="background:#b0e0e6;" | Atlantic Ocean
| style="background:#b0e0e6;" |
|-
| 
! scope="row" | 
|
|-
| 
! scope="row" | 
|
|-
| style="background:#b0e0e6;" | 
! scope="row" style="background:#b0e0e6;" | Atlantic Ocean
| style="background:#b0e0e6;" | Gulf of Guinea
|-
| 
! scope="row" | 
|
|-
| style="background:#b0e0e6;" | 
! scope="row" style="background:#b0e0e6;" | Atlantic Ocean
| style="background:#b0e0e6;" | Bight of Benin
|}

See also
4th parallel north
6th parallel north

References

n05